Marco Paniccia (born 17 May 1980) is an Italian lightweight rower. He won a gold medal at the 2002 World Rowing Championships in Seville with the lightweight men's eight.

References

1980 births
Living people
Italian male rowers
World Rowing Championships medalists for Italy